The 10th Parliament of Navarre is the current meeting of the Parliament of Navarre, the regional legislature of Navarre, with the membership determined by the results of the regional election held on 26 May 2019. The parliament met for the first time on 19 June 2019. According to the Statute of Autonomy of Navarre the maximum legislative term of the parliament is 4 years.

Election
The 10th Navarrese parliamentary election was held on 26 May 2019. It saw the newly-formed conservative Sum Navarre (NA+) alliance became the largest party in the parliament, but falling short of a majority.

History
The new parliament met for the first time on 19 June 2019 and after two rounds of voting Unai Hualde of Geroa Bai (GB) was elected President of the Parliament of Navarre with the support of the Socialist Party of Navarre (PSN), EH Bildu (EHB), Podemos-Ahal Dugu and Izquierda-Ezkerra (I-E).

Other members of the Bureau of the Parliament of Navarre were also elected on 19 June 2019: Inmaculada Jurío (PSN), First Vice-President; Yolanda Ibáñez (NA+), Second Vice-President; Juan Sánchez (NA+), First Secretary; Maiorga Ramirez (EHB), Second Secretary.

Government

After two rounds of voting María Chivite (PSN) was elected President of Navarre on 2 August 2019 with the support of GB, Podemos and I-E after EHB chose to abstain.

Members

References
 

2019 establishments in Navarre
 
Parliament of Navarre